Jay Stein was the Chairman and CEO of the MCA (Music Corporation of America) Recreation Services Group. He was responsible for expanding the Universal Studios Hollywood Tour, opening the Universal Amphitheatre, and founding the amusement park Universal Studios Florida. Stein started in the mailroom at MCA in October of 1959 and retired on January 6, 1993. He was inducted into the IAAPA Hall of Fame in 1999.

References

Living people
Universal Pictures
1938 births
NBCUniversal people